The 2022 Copa Perú Femenina season, was an amateur women's football championship, developed, organized, and promoted by the Peruvian Football Federation (FPF), which granted two direct promotion spots to the 2023 Liga Femenina. This was the 13rd edition of the Women's Peru Cup and for the first time it had a second division character, granting direct promotion to the Liga Femenina.

In 2020, the main tournament was renamed as Liga Femenina while the Campeonato Nacional de Fútbol Femenino served as the basis for structuring the second-level league competition that was designated as Copa Perú Femenina.

Departamental Stage

Regional Stage

Region I

First round

|}

Second round

|}

Third round

|}

Region II

Semifinals

|}

Final

|}

Region III

|}

Region IV

|}

Region V

First round

|}

Second round

|}

Third round

|}

Semifinals

|}

Final

|}

Region VI

|}

Region VII

|}

Region VIII

|}

National Stage

Fase I: Quarterfinals

Fase II: Semifinals

Fase III: Finals

Third Place Playoff

Final

See also
 2022 Liga Femenina

References

External links
 Official Website
  Dechalaca Copa Peru
  Semanario Pasión

Peru
2022 in Peruvian football